Alberto Colombo (born 23 February 1946 in Varedo, Lombardy) is a former racing driver from Italy.  He unsuccessfully entered three Formula One Grands Prix in 1978 with ATS (two failures to qualify) and Merzario (one failure to pre-qualify). He won the 1974 Italian Formula Three Championship and also enjoyed some success in Formula Two. He is the father of WEC driver Lorenzo Colombo.

Racing record

Complete European Formula Two Championship results
(key) (Races in bold indicate pole position; races in italics indicate fastest lap)

Complete Formula One World Championship results
(key)

Complete British Formula One Championship results
(key) (Races in bold indicate pole position; races in italics indicate fastest lap)

References
Profile at F1 Rejects

1946 births
Living people
Italian racing drivers
Italian Formula One drivers
ATS Wheels Formula One drivers
Merzario Formula One drivers
British Formula One Championship drivers
European Formula Two Championship drivers
Italian Formula Three Championship drivers